Henry Pinkerton (7 May 1915 – 1986) was a Scottish footballer.

Career
Pinkerton played for Hull City before joining Port Vale in May 1935. After just two games he was released at the end of the 1935–36 season, at which point he moved on to Burnley. He made his Burnley debut on 26 September 1936 in the goalless draw with Swansea Town at Turf Moor. Pinkerton made two further league appearances for Burnley in the 1937–38 campaign, before leaving to play for Falkirk and later Bo'ness United. After quitting professional football, he emigrated to Canada to work as a coach.

Career statistics
Source:

References

External links
 London Hearts profile

Footballers from Glasgow
Scottish footballers
Scotland wartime international footballers
Association football inside forwards
Hull City A.F.C. players
Port Vale F.C. players
Burnley F.C. players
Falkirk F.C. players
Bo'ness United F.C. players
English Football League players
Scottish Junior Football Association players
Scottish Football League players
Association football coaches
Scottish emigrants to Canada
1915 births
1986 deaths